María Mock (born 7 October 1957) is a Puerto Rican former swimmer. She competed in four events at the 1976 Summer Olympics.

References

External links
 

1957 births
Living people
Puerto Rican female swimmers
Olympic swimmers of Puerto Rico
Swimmers at the 1976 Summer Olympics
Swimmers at the 1971 Pan American Games
Pan American Games competitors for Puerto Rico
Place of birth missing (living people)